Hannah Montana and Miley Cyrus: Best of Both Worlds Concert is a 2008 American concert film produced and released by Walt Disney Pictures presented in Disney Digital 3D. It was first released in the United States and Canada for one week beginning on February 1, 2008. The film is directed by Bruce Hendricks and produced by Art Repola.

The world television premiere on Disney Channel was on July 26, 2008. The Disney Channel premiere brought 5.9 million viewers.

Songs

As Hannah Montana, Isabella Crovetti as Vampirina, Amy Palant as Poppy, with Miranda Cosgrove as Bridget, and Lea Michele as Butterbean (Hannah Montana 2: Meet Miley Cyrus)
"Rock Star"
"Life's What You Make It"
"Just Like You"
"Nobody's Perfect"
"Pumpin' Up the Party" 
"I Got Nerve"
"We Got the Party" (featuring Jonas Brothers)
"Me for Me"
"We are All-Stars"
"The Ghoul Girls are Back"
"Whipping up a Melody"

Jonas Brothers
"When You Look Me in the Eyes"
"Year 3000"

As Miley Cyrus
"Start All Over"
"Good & Broken" (Only on CD)
"See You Again"
"Let's Dance"
"Right Here" 
"I Miss You"
"G.N.O. (Girl's Night Out)"
"The Best of Both Worlds" (featuring Hannah Montana)

Release

Theatrical
The film began a week-long engagement in 683 theaters on February 1, 2008. In its opening weekend, it grossed $31.1 million. As of 2022, it continues to be the most successful Super Bowl weekend opening, a particularly barren spot in the winter dump months of the movie-release calendar.

Home media
The DVD arrived on both formats in America on August 19. The DVD, a 2-Disc Extended Edition, includes an 82-minute cut in both 2D and 3D viewing modes. Bonus features on both include behind-the-scenes footage with Miley, Billy Ray, and the Jonas Brothers; a sing-along mode, and "total concert immersion through 3D viewing capability". The DVD contains a Dolby 5.1 track and both full-screen and anamorphic widescreen formats, while Blu-ray goes 16x9 only and delivers DTS-HD MA 7.1 surround sound, one of the first Blu-ray releases to have that specific surround sound. Recalling the successful theatrical gimmick, the home video releases were vowed to be sold "for a limited time only". The DVD and Blu-ray were released in the United Kingdom on November 3, 2008, and the DVD was released in Australia on October 8.

Television
Hannah Montana and Miley Cyrus: Best of Both Worlds Concert premiered on Disney Channel and Disney XD on July 26, 2008, and brought over 20.6 million viewers. Though the channel's highest-viewed film, it is not counted as a Disney Channel Original Movie due to being shot live and receiving a theatrical release.

It premiered in Disney Channel Latin America on July 3, 2010 as the ¡Canta Montana! (Sing, Montana!) programming, and brought over 19.9 million viewers. It premiered in Estonia on TV3 on January 29, 2011 as the Hanna Montana ja Miley Cyrus: Parimad lood (Hannah Montana & Miley Cyrus: Best of Both Worlds), which rated 15.3 million viewers as part of the third season's premiere.

The latter was released on Disney Channel Asia with an average of 22.4 million viewers. The initial viewing was in 3D, with the 2D version the following day.

Reception

On review aggregator Rotten Tomatoes, the film holds an approval rating of 71% and an average rating of 6.00/10, based on 45 reviews. The website's critics consensus reads: "This high-energy concert film should please Cyrus' rabid pre-teen fan base -- and may come as a pleasant surprise for parents." On Metacritic, the film has a weighted average score of 59 out of 100 based on 13 critics, indicating "mixed or average reviews".

See also

Hannah Montana: The Movie

References

External links
 
 
 
 
 
 
 Hannah Montana/Miley Cyrus: Best of Both Worlds - Miley Cyrus Interview
 Hannah Montana/Miley Cyrus: Best of Both Worlds - Miley Cyrus Australian Press Interview from LA
 Disney: Hannah Montana MyConcert MemoryBook

2008 films
3D concert films
Walt Disney Pictures films
Films based on television series
Hannah Montana
Jonas Brothers
2008 3D films
American 3D films
Films directed by Bruce Hendricks
2000s English-language films